Eublepharis angramainyu, also known as the Iranian fat-tailed gecko or Iraqi eyelid gecko, is a nocturnal ground dwelling lizard native to Iraq, Iran, Turkey and Syria. Its diet is insectivorous but may eat smaller vertebrates. Like most lizards it has the ability to shed its tail (autotomy).

References

External links 

 
 http://sci.ege.edu.tr/~bgocmen/eangramainyu.html

Eublepharis
Geckos of Iran
Reptiles described in 1966